Venancio Costa (born 23 August 1967) is a Spanish former volleyball player who competed in the 1992 Summer Olympics.

Sporting achievements

National team
 1995  Universiade

References

1967 births
Living people
Spanish men's volleyball players
Olympic volleyball players of Spain
Volleyball players at the 1992 Summer Olympics
Universiade medalists in volleyball
Universiade silver medalists for Spain
Medalists at the 1995 Summer Universiade